Viluppuram, Villupuram, or Vizhuppuram is a Municipality and the administrative headquarters of Viluppuram district. 

Agriculture is a main source of income. As Government of India 2011 census data indicated, Viluppuram had a population of 96,253. and the town's literacy rate has been recorded as 90.16% by Census 2011.

In 1919, Vilppuram was officially constituted as a municipality, which today comprises 42 wards, making it the largest town and municipality in Viluppuram district.

History
In 1677, Shivaji took Gingee area with the assistance of Golkonda forces. Later in 18th century, both the English and French acquired settlements in South Arcot. During the Anglo-French rivalry, the entire district was turned into a war land. After some time, the entire area came under the control of East India Company. It remained under British authority till 1947 when India became independent.

After independence, the district as we know it today, was part of the larger South Arcot District headquartered at Cuddalore . On 30 September 1993, Villupuram became the headquarters of the newly created Vizhuppuram District as a result of the division of the South Arcot District.

Geography

The area contains metamorphic rocks formed by pressure and heat belonging to the granite-like gneiss family. There are also three major groups of sedimentary rocks, layers of particles that settled in different geological periods.

Climate
Since the town is landlocked, the weather in Viluppuram is generally humid and hot. It relies on the monsoon for rain from July to December. Winters are moderate with temperatures ranging between  Viluppuram has a tropical climate. In winter, there is much less rainfall in Viluppuram than in summer. This climate is considered to be Aw/As according to the Köppen-Geiger climate classification.

Demographics

, Viluppuram municipality was divided into 44 wards for which elections are held every five years and had a population of 96,253 of which 47,670 were male and 48,583 female.

Administration 

Politically, Viluppuram is part of the Vizhuppuram Lok Sabha constituency and the Vizhuppuram State Assembly constituency. The municipality was established in 1919 and was upgraded to a second-grade municipality in 1953, the first-grade municipality in 1973, and a selection grade municipality in 1988. The town is divided into 42 wards. The municipal council is composed of 42 ward councilors and is headed by a chairperson elected by voters of the town. Councilors-elect a vice-chairperson among themselves while the executive wing is headed by a commissioner, who is assisted by a team of officials including the health officer, municipal engineer, town planning officer, manager, revenue officer and other staff.

Transport

Road
Viluppuram is connected by roads to major cities and to the rest of the state. The major national highways of the town are:
 NH 38, which connects Vellore and Thoothukudi, via Tiruvannamalai - Viluppuram – Tiruchirapalli –Madurai – Aruppukottai.
 SH 07 connects  Villupuram --   Tirukoilur.
 NH 332, which connects Viluppuram and Pondicherry.
 NH 132, which Connects Villupuram and Tindivanam.
 NH NH 45A, which Connects Villupuram and Nagapattinam.
 NH 36, which connects Vikravandi and Manamadurai via Panruti – Neyveli – Kumbakonam - Thanjavur - Pudukottai  bypasses Villupuram at 5 km in Koliyanur.

Rail

The Viluppuram Railway Junction at Vizhuppuram serves as the distribution point of rail traffic from Chennai, the state capital of Tamil Nadu, towards the southern part of the state. Five railway lines branch out of Vizhuppuram: 
 Fully Electrified Double BG (Broad Gauge)  line (FEDL) towards Chennai Beach via Chengulpattu Junction.
 Fully Electrified Double BG (Broad Gauge) line (FEDL) towards Tiruchirapalli Junction via Vridhachalam Junction and Ariyalur. Also called "Chord Line" to Tiruchirapalli.
 Fully Electrified Single BG (Broad Gauge) line (FEDL) towards Tiruchirapalli Junction via Cuddalore Port Junction, Mayiladuthurai, Kumbakonam and Thanjavur Junction. Also called Main Line.
 Fully Electrified Single BG (Broad Gauge) line towards Katpadi Junction via Tirukoilur Tiruvannamalai and Vellore Cantonment.
 Fully Electrified Single BG (Broad Gauge) line to Pondicherry.

Air
The nearest airport is Pondicherry Airport at Pondicherry, in Puducherry, approximately 40 km from Viluppuram. Pondicherry Airport is connected to Bangalore by commercial airlines.

The nearest major airport is the Chennai International Airport (MAA), approximately 147 km from the town; the next closest major airport is Tiruchirapalli international Airport, approximately 170 km from the town.

References

External links
Viluppuram District Official Website

Cities and towns in Viluppuram district